Kwaku Acheampong Bonful (born January 31, 1947) is a Ghanaian former politician and a member of the First and Second Parliament of the Fourth Republic representing the Prestea-Huni Valley constituency in the Western Region of Ghana.

Early life and education 
Bonful was born on 31 January 1947 at Prestea-Huni Valley in the Western Region of Ghana. He attended the Kalini Party of School, Germany, and obtained his certificate. He again attended the University of Ghana and the Ghana School of Law and obtained his LL.B and his Bachelor of Law after studying political science of law.

Politics 
Bonful was first elected into Parliament on the ticket of the National Democratic Congress for the Prestea-Huni Valley Constituency in the Western Region of Ghana during the 1992 Ghanaian General Elections. He was re-elected during the 1996 General Elections. He won with 19,433 votes out of the valid votes cast representing 32.90% over Akwasi Gyima-Bota, Benjamin Bekoe, Emmanuel Ewudzi, Joseph Imbiah-Tismark, Nana Nuako and Albert Kwaku Obbin who polled 18,498 votes, 2,234 votes, 1,618 votes, 1,350 votes, 0 vote and 0 vote respectively. He was defeated by Albert Kwaku Obbin of the New Patrriotic Party who polled 19,131 votes representing 48.40% against Bonful who was his nearest competitor and polled 12,240 votes representing 31.00% out of the 100% votes cast.

Career 
Bonful was a deputy minister of interior and a former member of Parliament for the Prestea-Huni Valley Constituency from 1993 to 2001. He was also a lawyer by profession.

Death 
Bonful died in a motor accident on Tarkwa-Bogoso road on Thursday. He died on 1 August 2002.

References

1947 births
2002 deaths
Government ministers of Ghana
People from Western Region (Ghana)
National Democratic Congress (Ghana) politicians
University of Ghana alumni
Ghana School of Law alumni
20th-century Ghanaian lawyers
Ghanaian MPs 1997–2001
Ghanaian MPs 1993–1997
21st-century Ghanaian politicians